Brineton is a hamlet in Staffordshire, England. It is 3/4 mile north of the village of Blymhill, and is within the civil parish of Blymhill and Weston-under-Lizard. Its name is derived from the Anglo Saxon term for "Bryni's settlement". The hamlet contains the 17th-century Brineton House, and Laurel Farm, a brick house built in 1678.

See also
Listed buildings in Blymhill and Weston-under-Lizard

References

Hamlets in Staffordshire